Cryogenix is In Strict Confidence's first album.

Track listing

References

External links 
 

In Strict Confidence albums
1996 debut albums